Ivanilda (Vanny) Reis (born 13 October 1985 in Mindelo, Cape Verde) is the current holder of the titles Miss West Africa and Miss West Africa Cape Verde.

Miss West Africa
As the official representative of Cape Verde for the 2011 Miss West Africa pageant held in Banjul, the Gambia on December 18, 2011, Vanny Reis captured the crown of Miss West Africa 2011/12, becoming the first woman to win an international pageant for Cape Verde.

References

External links 
 Miss West Africa

1985 births
Living people
Cape Verdean beauty pageant winners
People from São Vicente, Cape Verde